The Belfast–Larne line, or Larne line, is a railway line in Northern Ireland, operated by Northern Ireland Railways. It runs as double track along the majority of its route north along the scenic east Antrim coastline from Belfast to the coastal seaport town of Larne, serving commuters and ferry passengers.

Route

Belfast
From , the line crosses the River Lagan on the Lagan Viaduct, branches from the Bangor line, recrosses the Lagan parallel to the M3 motorway on the Dargan Bridge and reaches its first stop, Yorkgate, which replaced the former York Road terminus in 1992. Parallel to the dual five-lane M2 motorway (once the UK's widest), the line now heads northeast, past the main Northern Ireland Railways engineering depot and engine sheds, along the coast towards Whitehouse, a former halt. The line then continues north along the coast of Belfast Lough.

Whiteabbey
At Whiteabbey, the line enters a cutting and climbs towards Bleach Green Junction. The station is long gone here too (1977), but the lines diverge here, with the Londonderry line continuing to Mossley West and Antrim. The next stops – Jordanstown (University of Ulster, level crossing), Greenisland (former junction) and Trooperslane (level crossing) – are still a few hundred yards inland, and Belfast Lough can be seen from time to time where development is sparse. After Trooperslane, the line passes through a former halt at Mount. This station was closed in the early 1970s.

Carrickfergus
Carrickfergus town still has three stations, Clipperstown, Carrickfergus and Downshire. The former halt at Barn has been closed since 1977 (around the same time as Bleach Green Halt). At Downshire bridge the line crosses the A2 road once more and from here north, it follows the coastline at low level, offering views over the lough towards County Down and the Copeland Islands.

Downshire
From Downshire, the line runs through a former halt at Eden. The station here was closed back in 1977(similar to Barn and Bleach Green Stations). Erosion has effected maintenance along this section, and the line singles now at Kilroot (closed halt, power station) where previously it carried on as double track to Whitehead. The outer up track has been removed (officially temporarily) for safety reasons. At Whitehead Station, there is a passing loop and a spur to the former Excursion Station which is the headquarters of the Railway Preservation Society of Ireland.

Larne
Then north to Larne as single track, there are three intermediate halts, Ballycarry, Magheramorne, and Glynn, each serving villages en route. On the coastal side, the peninsula of Islandmagee blocks views of Scotland, but forms the wildlife wetlands of Larne Lough. Small sections of the track at the Larne end are built on causeways, forming ponds landside of the railway.

On entering the town, the railway again crosses the road inland to Larne Town station before reaching its terminus at Larne Harbour station, sharing its building with the ferry terminal for the Port of Larne.

Services
Evening services are reduced to hourly operation after 8pm between Larne Harbour and Great Victoria Street and the last trains of the day in each direction typically at around 11:20pm only operate to or from Lanyon Place. The last train arrives into Larne Harbour at 12:20am.

On Saturdays, there are no extra peak time services, but the service pattern is similar to the weekday operation.

On Sundays, the line reduces to hourly operation from Great Victoria Street, with the outbound terminus alternating every hour between Whitehead and Larne Harbour. First services on Sunday are later and Last services are earlier.

Ferry connections
P&O Ferries operate ferries to Cairnryan throughout the year.

Onward rail connections from Stranraer
The nearest railway station to Cairnryan is Stranraer railway station. This is around fifteen minutes away by a dedicated connecting bus, route number 350 operated by McLeans. Local buses provide additional journeys between Cairnryan and Stranraer. From Stranraer station ScotRail trains operate to Glasgow Central. Sometimes a change is required at Ayr.

References

External links 
 http://www.translink.co.uk
 Larne Line Passenger Group

Railway lines in Northern Ireland
Transport in Belfast
Transport in County Antrim
Transport in Larne
Irish gauge railways